Balada Mexicana is a 1915 musical composition by Mexican composer Manuel Ponce. 

Compositions by Manuel Ponce
1915 compositions